The Battle of Ostrołęka was fought on 16 February 1807 between a First French Empire force under General of Division Anne Jean Marie René Savary and a Russian force under Lieutenant General Ivan Essen. The French defeated the Russians and forced them to retreat to the east to Wyoki Mazowiecki. Weather conditions caused both sides to go into winter quarters immediately after the battle, which occurred during the War of the Fourth Coalition, part of the Napoleonic Wars. Ostrołęka is located in the northeast part of modern Poland, but in 1807 it belonged to the Kingdom of Prussia.

Context 
See Battle of Mohrungen and Battle of Eylau articles.

Savary was "in command of the 5th corps" "on the extreme French right" so as "to guard the approaches to Warsaw by the Narew and Bug, and to cover the right rear of the movement northwards."  After the French were "driven out of Ostrów" "on the 3rd February", "Savary received orders to abandon Brok and retire upon Ostrolenka, so as to strengthen his communication with the Emperor's army."  "Essen was ordered by Bennigsen to drive back Savary, who, at the same time, had made up his mind to assume the offensive."  Essen, with "25,000 men, advanced to Ostrolenka on the 15th, along the two banks of the Narew."  Savary "decided to hold Ostrolenka on the defensive", on 15 February, leaving 3 brigades on the "low hills outside Ostrolenka flanked by batteries on the opposite bank, whilst he assumed the offensive on the morning of the 16th against the Russian force coming down the right bank."

Course 

Early on 16 February General of Division Honoré Théodore Maxime Gazan arrived at the vanguard with part of his division. At 9 AM he "met the enemy on the road to Nowogród" and attacked and routed them, but at the very same moment the Russians "attacked Ostrołęka by the left bank." General of Brigade François Frédéric Campana, with a brigade from Gazan's division, and General of Brigade François Amable Ruffin, with a brigade from General of Division Nicolas Charles Oudinot's division, defended the town. Savary sent General of Division Honoré Charles Reille, his chief of staff. The Russian infantry, in many columns, wished to take the city but the French let them advance halfway up the streets before charging them, leaving the "streets covered with the dead." The Russians "abandoned the town" and took up positions "behind the sand hills that covered it."

Oudinot and General of Division Louis Gabriel Suchet and their divisions "advanced" and by midday, the "heads of their columns arrived at Ostrołęka." "Oudinot commanded the left in two lines", whilst Suchet commanded the centre and Reille, "commanding a brigade" of Gazan's division, "formed the right." He "covered himself with all his artillery and marched against the enemy." "Oudinot put himself at the head" of a successful cavalry charge, cutting the cossacks in the enemy's rearguard to pieces. The exchange of fire was "brisk", with the Russians giving "way on all sides and was followed fighting for three leagues."

Results 

The next day the Russians were "pursued several leagues." Two Russian generals and several other Russian officers were killed and three generals wounded. 63rd bulletin of the Grande Armée, 28 February 1807 The Russians left 1,200 wounded and 1,300 dead on the battlefield, with 7 cannon and two flags captured by the French. Only 60 French troops were killed, including Campana whose death was much grieved by Napoleon, with 400 to 500 wounded including Colonel Duhamel of the 21st Light Infantry Regiment and artillery Colonel Henri Marie Lenoury.

"Savary's action at Ostrolenka...had been useful in disclosing the fact the Russians were in no great strength on this side, and that Napoleon had little to fear from any attempt to strike his communications with Warsaw."

Oudinot was made a Count of the Empire and given a 'donation' of million francs. Savary received the Légion d'honneur.

Napoleon "ordered the 5th Corps to go into winter quarters" "along the right banks of the Omulew and Narew down to Sierock." "holding Ostrolenka with a detachment and repairing the bride there."  The thaw was "dreadful" and the season allowed for no more campaigning – the enemy had left their winter quarters first, and "repented it."

The battle of Ostrołęka is mentioned at the galerie des batailles at Versailles and on the Arc de Triomphe and is a battle honour of several French regiments.

Notes

References
 
  62nd and 63rd bulletin of the Grande Armée

External links

Conflicts in 1807
Battles of the Napoleonic Wars
Battles of the War of the Fourth Coalition
Battles involving France
Battles involving Russia
History of Masovian Voivodeship
Ostrołęka
1807 in Poland
February 1807 events
Battles inscribed on the Arc de Triomphe